(C6)-CP 47,497 (CP 47,497 dimethylhexyl homologue) is a synthetic cannabinoid, a CP 47,497 homologue.

Its systematic name is 2-[(1S,3R)-3-hydroxycyclohexyl]-5-(1,1-dimethylhexyl)phenol.

See also 
 Synthetic cannabis
 (C7)-CP 47,497 also known as CP 47,497
 (C8)-CP 47,497 also known as Cannabicyclohexanol
 (C9)-CP 47,497

References 

Cannabinoids
Designer drugs
Cyclohexanols
Phenols
Pfizer brands